William Edgar Culkin (October 15, 1860 – June 25, 1949) was an American newspaper editor, historian, and educator. He was raised in New York, and later moved to Minnesota, where he served on the Minnesota Senate between 1895 and 1898 as a Republican.

Early life
William Edgar Culkin was born in Oswego, New York, in 1860, where his early schooling took place.  He emigrated to Minnesota in 1880, and he taught there for two years while continuing his studies.  Culkin read law and was allowed to practice law from 1882, initially in Waverly, a town in Wright County.  He was married in 1886 to Hannah Alice Young, and they soon settled in Buffalo, Minnesota.  He and his wife had a son and three daughters.  One, Margaret Culkin Banning, became a best selling author.

Career
Culkin was elected three times as county attorney of Wright County, beginning in 1886.  He belonged to the Republican Party.  Culkin was elected to District 38 of the state senate representing Sherburne and Wright counties during the 29th and 30th State Legislative Sessions, which ran from January 1895 to January 1898.  He defeated the Democratic and Populist party candidate, David Murdock.  He served on several committees, and was chair of the Geological and Natural History Survey committee.  In late 1897, he became the Registrar of the United States Land Office, in Duluth.

Later life and death
Culkin was an associate editor of the Duluth Herald Newspaper early in the twentieth century.  He became known as a local historian following his government career, and in 1922 was made the first president of the St. Louis County Historical Society.  He died at Duluth in 1949 and is buried in Calvary Cemetery, Duluth, Minnesota.

Notes

1860 births
1949 deaths
American lawyers admitted to the practice of law by reading law
19th-century American politicians
19th-century American lawyers
Minnesota lawyers
County attorneys in Minnesota
Republican Party Minnesota state senators
People from Wright County, Minnesota
Politicians from Oswego, New York
Editors of Minnesota newspapers
20th-century American newspaper editors
20th-century American historians
20th-century American male writers
Local historians
Historians of Minnesota
American male non-fiction writers
Historians from New York (state)